Theodore George "Ted" Paraskevakos (born March 25, 1937, in Athens, Greece) is a Greek-American inventor and businessman. Paraskevakos graduated from the Superior College of Electronics in Greece and served for 28 months as communications and electronics instructor in the Hellenic Air Force. He attended a variety of courses for digital engineering in Alabama and in Florida.

Notable Invention

Paraskevakos' most notable inventions relate to the transmission of electronic data through telephone lines which formed the original basis for what is now known as caller ID.  Paraskevakos began his work in this field in 1968 while working as a communications engineer with SITA and has since been issued over 20 patents worldwide based on this technology. His  transmitter and receiver were put into practice in 1971 in a Boeing facility in Huntsville, Alabama.

Patents
Paraskevakos holds over 50 patents worldwide including a digital alarm communication system, which also covered handheld or portable cardiac alarms automatic meter reading and load management, digital vending machine communications, indoor archery, vertical parking, intelligent currency validation network, and a method for identification of currency used in unlawful activity.  He founded, among other companies, Metretek, Inc., DataVend, Inc. and Intelligent Currency Validation Network, Inc.

References

External links

Theodore G. Paraskevakos Inventions, Patents and Patent Applications, JUSTIA Patents
Patent for Apparatus for generating and transmitting digital information
Patent for Decoding and display apparatus for groups of pulse trains
Patent for Sensor monitoring device
Patent for Archery/practice exercise device and attachments therefor
Patent for Apparatus and method for remote sensor monitoring, metering and control
Patent for Vending machine and method for automatic vending and returning of merchandise, particularly video cassette tapes

1937 births
Living people
Greek inventors
Businesspeople from Athens